The 1972–73 NCAA College Division men's ice hockey season began in November 1972 and concluded in March of the following year. This was the 9th season of second-tier college ice hockey.

Regular season

Season tournaments

Standings

See also
 1972–73 NCAA University Division men's ice hockey season

References

External links

 
NCAA